Misty Roses is a popular song, written by Tim Hardin in 1966. 
It was one of Hardin's most-covered songs and originally appeared on his debut album Tim Hardin 1.

Recorded versions

Cilla Black
Colin Blunstone
Sonny Bono
Xavier Cugat
Bobby Darin
The Fifth Dimension
The Four Freshmen
Astrud Gilberto
Irene Kral
Peggy Lee
Johnny Mathis
Modern Jazz Quartet
Kenny Rankin
The Sandpipers (on the 1967 album of the same name)
Sonny & Cher
Jesse Colin Young
The Youngbloods (B-side to "Hippie from Olema" and on the 1970 album Rock Festival)
The Zombies

References 

1966 songs
Songs written by Tim Hardin
The Youngbloods songs